The women's featherweight (−59 kilograms) event at the 2006 Asian Games took place on 10 December 2006 at Qatar SC Indoor Hall, Doha, Qatar.

A total of twelve competitors from twelve countries competed in this event, limited to fighters whose body weight was less than 59 kilograms. 

Lee Sung-hye from South Korea won the gold medal after beating Nguyễn Thị Hoài Thu of Vietnam in gold medal match 3–0, The bronze medal was shared by Nepalese Ayasha Shakya and Tseng Pei-hua of Chinese Taipei. Athletes from Uzbekistan, Kazakhstan, China and Philippines shared the fifth place.

The bronze medalist Tseng Pei-hua later changed her name to Tseng Li-cheng.

Schedule
All times are Arabia Standard Time (UTC+03:00)

Results

References

Results

External links
Official website

Taekwondo at the 2006 Asian Games